Óscar Arístides Renta Fiallo (22 July 1932 – 20 October 2014), known professionally as Oscar de la Renta, was a Dominican-American fashion designer. Born in Santo Domingo, he was trained by Cristóbal Balenciaga and Antonio del Castillo. De la Renta became internationally known in the 1960s as one of the couturiers who dressed Jacqueline Kennedy. He worked for Lanvin and Balmain. His eponymous fashion house has boutiques around the world including in Harrods of London and Madison Avenue in New York.

Early life 
De la Renta, the youngest of seven children and the only boy in his family, was born in Santo Domingo, Dominican Republic, to a Dominican mother of distant Portuguese descent, Carmen María Antonia Fiallo and a Puerto Rican father, Óscar Avelino De La Renta, owner of an insurance company. The Fiallos, De la Renta's mother's family, were so embedded in Dominican society that they could count poets, scholars, and businessmen, as well as top army brass among their members. Their origin in the island can be traced back to the foundation of San Carlos de Tenerife in 1685 by Canarian settlers.

A maternal uncle, Luis Arístides Fiallo Cabral, was a doctor, lawyer, and architect, who received every degree the University of Santo Domingo could offer. Another maternal uncle, Fabio Fiallo, was a diplomat and poet. On his father's side, De la Renta's great-great grandfather José Ortíz de la Renta was the first mayor of Ponce, Puerto Rico, elected by popular vote and who had the distinction of serving as mayor eight times, the most ever for the city.

De la Renta was raised Catholic in a protective family. His mother died from complications of multiple sclerosis when he was 18.

At the age of 18, he went to study painting in Spain at the Royal Academy of San Fernando in Madrid. For extra money, he drew clothes for newspapers and fashion houses. After Francesca Lodge, the wife of John Davis Lodge, the U.S. Ambassador to Spain, saw some of his dress sketches, she commissioned de la Renta to design a gown for her daughter. The dress appeared on the cover of Life magazine that fall. He quickly became interested in the world of fashion design and began sketching for leading Spanish fashion houses, which soon led to an apprenticeship with Spain's most renowned couturier, Cristóbal Balenciaga. He considered Cristóbal Balenciaga his mentor. In 1961, de la Renta left Spain to join Antonio del Castillo as a couture assistant at Lanvin in Paris.

Career 

In 1963, de la Renta turned to Diana Vreeland, the editor-in-chief of Vogue, for advice, saying that what he really wanted was to "get into ready to wear, because that's where the money is". Vreeland replied, "Then go to Arden because you will make your reputation faster. She is not a designer, so she will promote you. At the other place, you will always be eclipsed by the name of Dior." De la Renta proceeded to work for Arden for two years in New York City before he went to work for Jane Derby, an American fashion house. When Derby died in August 1965, de la Renta took over the label.

From 1993 to 2002, de la Renta designed the haute couture collection for the house of Balmain, becoming the first Dominican to design for a French couture house. In 2006, the Oscar de la Renta label diversified into bridal wear.

De la Renta's designs have been worn by a diverse group of distinguished women and celebrities. De la Renta's brand saw international wholesale growth beginning in 2003, under the direction of CEO Alex Bolen, from five to seventy-five locations. De la Renta's ready-to-wear designs are available in his retail stores, online, and with select wholesale partners worldwide.

In 2014, the George W. Bush Presidential Center hosted an exhibit titled "Oscar de la Renta: Five Decades of Style" which shared the designer's creations for Mrs. Bush and America's First Ladies.

Other enterprises 
In 1977, de la Renta launched his fragrance, OSCAR, followed by an accessories line in 2001 and a homewares line in 2002. The new business venture included 100 home furnishings for Century Furniture featuring dining tables, upholstered chairs, and couches. In 2004, he added a less expensive line of clothing called O Oscar. De la Renta said he wanted to attract new customers whom he could not previously reach.

In 2006, de la Renta designed Tortuga Bay, a boutique hotel at Puntacana Resort and Club. The hotel is part of the luxury hotel collection, The Leading Hotels of the World.

Awards, honors, and philanthropic endeavors

Design awards 
In 1967 and 1968, de la Renta won the Coty Award (the U.S. fashion industry "Oscars") and in 1973 was inducted into the Coty Hall of Fame.

From 1973 to 1976, and from 1986 to 1988, he served as President of the CFDA. He is also a two-time winner of the American Fashion Critic's Award and was inducted into the Fame in 1973.

De la Renta's talents received continual international recognition. Among them, he received the Council of Fashion Designers Designer of the Year Award in 2000 and in 2007 (tied with Proenza Schouler). In February 1990, he was honored with the CFDA Lifetime Achievement Award. King Juan Carlos of Spain bestowed de la Renta with two awards, the Gold Medal of Bellas Artes and the La Gran Cruz de la Orden del Mérito Civil. He was recognized by the French government with the Légion d'honneur as a Commandeur.

Other awards 
Oscar de la Renta was named to the International Best Dressed List Hall of Fame in 1973.

The Dominican Republic honored him with the Order of Merit of Duarte, Sánchez and Mella and the Order of Christopher Columbus. De la Renta founded the Casa del Niño orphanage in La Romana He contributed extensively in the construction of a much needed school near his home at the Punta Cana Resort and Club in Punta Cana. 

De la Renta held dual citizenship in the Dominican Republic and the United States. He was an Ambassador-at-Large of the Dominican Republic.

De la Renta served as a board member of the Metropolitan Opera, Carnegie Hall and WNET. He served on the boards of several charitable institutions such as New Yorkers for Children, the America's Society. He was chairman of the Queen Sofía Spanish Institute. He received an honorary degree from Hamilton College (New York) on 26 May 2013.

In February 2014, Oscar de la Renta recreated his entire Spring presentation, Designed for A Cure 2014 collection, to raise money for the Sylvester Comprehensive Cancer Center at the University of Miami Leonard M. Miller School of Medicine.

Honors 
In 1991, de la Renta was the recipient of the Golden Plate Award of the American Academy of Achievement. In 2014, de la Renta was the recipient of the Carnegie Hall Medal of Excellence.
In 2017, de la Renta was honored by the United States Postal Service with an eleven stamp series, featuring a black and white photo of him and ten details from his fashion designs.

Personal life 
In 1966, de la Renta became the third husband of Françoise de Langlade (1921–1983), an editor-in-chief of French Vogue who once worked for the fashion house of Elsa Schiaparelli. They were married until she died of cancer in 1983. After her death, de la Renta adopted a boy from the Dominican Republic and named him Moisés.

In 1990, the designer married Annette Engelhard (born 1939), daughter of Fritz Mannheimer and his wife Jane née Reiss, and adoptive daughter of her mother's second husband, Charles W. Engelhard, Jr. De la Renta had stepchildren from both marriages. His son-in-law Alex Bolen currently operates as Chief Executive Officer, and stepdaughter Eliza Bolen serves as Vice President of Licensing at Oscar de la Renta, LLC.

De la Renta was regarded as an unofficial ambassador of the Dominican Republic, his home country, and held a diplomatic passport. He had homes there in Casa de Campo and Punta Cana, in addition to his residence in Kent, Connecticut.

Later life and death 
De la Renta was diagnosed with cancer in 2006. A year later at the CFDA "Fashion Talks" event, Executive Director Fern Mallis called him "The Sultan of Suave". At that event, he spoke of his cancer, saying:

De la Renta died of complications from cancer on October 20, 2014, at his home in Kent, Connecticut, at the age of 82.

See also 
 List of people from the Dominican Republic
 List of fashion designers

References

External links 
 
 
 Oscar de la Renta perfumes on Perfumes.com

1932 births
2014 deaths
American fashion businesspeople
American fashion designers
American people of Puerto Rican descent
American people of Canarian descent
Ballet designers
Dominican Republic fashion designers
Dominican Republic people of Canarian descent
Dominican Republic people of Puerto Rican descent
Dominican Republic people of Spanish descent
Dominican Republic emigrants to the United States
People from Santiago de los Caballeros
Deaths from cancer in Connecticut
People from Kent, Connecticut
People from Santo Domingo
Grand Officers of the Order of Christopher Columbus
Order of Merit of Duarte, Sánchez and Mella
High fashion brands
Carnegie Hall Medal of Excellence winners
People with acquired American citizenship